Brima Kamara may refer to:

Brima Acha Kamara, Inspector General of the Sierra Leone Police
Brima Bazzy Kamara (born 1968), military commander during the Sierra Leone Civil War who was convicted of crimes against humanity
Brima Kamara (footballer) (1972–1999), Sierra Leonean football goalkeeper